Graeme Walton (born 14 June 1981 in Belfast, Northern Ireland) is a retired British professional ice hockey defenceman who played his entire career for the Belfast Giants of the Elite Ice Hockey League.

A stay-at-home defenceman, Walton trained locally at the Dundonald Ice Bowl where he impressed Giants scouts and was eventually given a contract in 2003. He went on remain with the team throughout his career until his retirement in 2013 and became one of the Giants' most consistent players. He played a total of 480 regular season games for the Giants and is currently the Giants' all-time leader in games played. The Giants have retired his number 18 jersey in his honour.

Walton also played internationally for the Great Britain national ice hockey team.

References

External links

1981 births
Belfast Giants players
Living people
Ice hockey defencemen from Northern Ireland
Sportspeople from Belfast